Fagurhólsmýri is a small village in southern Iceland, located roughly ten kilometres south of the Oraefajokull volcano. The village has its own airport. Local attractions include Ingólshöfdi which is a trail.

References

Populated places in Eastern Region (Iceland)